Amos Rodgers, often spelled Amos Rogers, was an American politician. He was a state legislator in Georgia. He represented McIntosh County, Georgia from 1878 through 1879.

See also
African-American officeholders during and following the Reconstruction era

References

Members of the Georgia General Assembly
Year of birth missing
Year of death missing
African-American men in politics
19th-century African-American politicians
19th-century American politicians
People from McIntosh County, Georgia